Alligator Bay is a swamp in the U.S. state of Georgia.

Alligator Bay was named after the American alligator.

References

Swamps of Georgia (U.S. state)
Bodies of water of Bryan County, Georgia